Vriesea inflata is a plant species in the genus Vriesea.

The bromeliad is endemic to the Atlantic Forest biome (Mata Atlantica Brasileira), located in southeastern Brazil.

Cultivars
Garden cultivars include:
 Vriesea 'Charm'
Vriesea 'Charm Too'
Vriesea 'Chubby'
Vriesea 'Flirtation'
 Vriesea 'Golden Koi'
 Vriesea 'Infatuation'
 Vriesea 'Sacred Fire'
 Vriesea 'Sunrise'
 × Vrieslandsia 'Golden Touch'
 × Vrieslandsia 'Swamp Fire'

References

BSI Cultivar Registry . accessed 11 October 2009.

inflata
Endemic flora of Brazil
Flora of the Atlantic Forest